The Women's World Cup of Golf was a professional golf tournament contested by teams of two female golfers representing their respective countries. The tournament was played in two incarnations, first in 2000 at Adare Manor Hotel & Golf Resort, County Limerick in Ireland sanctioned by the Ladies European Tour, and later annually between 2005 and 2008 in South Africa sanctioned also by the LPGA Tour, money unofficial on both tours. The purse in the final year was US$1.4 million. The field consisted of twenty-two teams and each qualifying country could field one team. It was held in January or February, at the beginning of the season for the world's dominant professional tour, the U.S. LPGA Tour, and of other major tours such as those in Japan and Europe.

Winners

Performance by nation 2005–2008

See also
World Cup of Golf - the equivalent event for men's golf.

References

External links

TSN Ladies World Cup of  Golf  2000 - Results, Golf Sweden, 17 September 2000
LPGA official microsite

Former Ladies European Tour events
Team golf tournaments
Golf tournaments in the Republic of Ireland
Golf tournaments in South Africa
Golf in Munster
Golf
World championships in golf
Recurring sporting events established in 2005
Recurring sporting events disestablished in 2008